Jeevan Mrityu is a 1970 Hindi-language crime thriller film produced by Tarachand Barjatya for Rajshri Productions. The film starred Dharmendra, Raakhee, Ajit, Rajindernath and Leela Chitnis. The film was a remake of a 1967 Bengali film Jiban Mrityu starring Uttam Kumar and Supriya Devi in lead roles. The film's music was composed by Laxmikant Pyarelal while Anand Bakshi penned the lyrics.

The film was Raakhee's debut in Hindi movies. The movie's plot has resemblance with novel The Count of Monte Cristo.

Plot
Ashok Tandon and Deepa are childhood friends who study in the same college and love each other. After college Ashok starts working in a bank and soon becomes bank manager, and both are to be married soon. However, Ashok is arrested for theft from the bank. He asks Deepa to look after his mother, which she agrees to do. He is sentenced to prison for several years. After his release, he finds out that his mother has died; Deepa is married and has re-located; and he was framed by his colleagues at the bank. Devastated but still honest, he is befriended by Raja Ranbir Singh, who gives him a job, as well a new identity. Ashok now becomes Bikram Singh, and he must seek out Deepa, and his shrewd and calculating colleagues at the bank to extract vengeance.

Deepa and Shankar are kidnapped by Harish. Ashok agrees to pay ransom. Deepa learns that Bikram Singh is Ashok. A fight broke out between Harish's goons and Ashok. Prem Prakash saves Ashok from goons. Shankar hangs on roof and saved by Ashok. The police arrive and arrest Harish. The high court punishes Harish and his goons.

Cast

Dharmendra as Ashok Tandon and Bikram Sher Singh
Raakhee as Deepa Tandon
Ajit as Harishchandra Shroff 'Harish'
Kanhaiyalal as Jagat Narayan
Ramesh Deo as Barrister P. Amarnath
Bipin Gupta as Raja Ranvir Singh
P. Jairaj as S.N. Roy
Krishan Dhawan as Ramakant
Master Bunty as Shankar
Rajendra Nath as Prem Prakash
Leela Chitnis as Ashok's mother
Gajanan Jagirdar as Deepa's father
Shabnam as Jaishree
V. Gopal as Bhim Sen
Roopesh Kumar as Sameer
Murad as the Judge
Zeb Rahman as Singer in Bikram's party

Soundtrack 
All lyrics are by Anand Bakshi.

References

External links 
 

1970 films
1970s Hindi-language films
Rajshri Productions films
Films scored by Laxmikant–Pyarelal
Films directed by Satyen Bose
Hindi remakes of Bengali films